A Touch of The Blues is a 1988 live album by Blues singer Long John Baldry with extra studio tracks.

The album was a re-issue of the 1987 live album Long John Baldry & Friends with the addition of three newly recorded studio tracks. This album has sunk into partial obscurity even though it has been released on vinyl (1988) and CD (1990). For reasons unknown, the small spoken intro to "Rake and Ramblin' Boy" was cut down for this version.

Track listing 

 "Goin' Down Slow" (James Burke Oden) – 5:23
 "I Got My Mojo Workin'" (Preston Foster) – 5:24
 "Spoonful" (Willie Dixon) – 4:28
 "Rake and Ramblin' Boy" (Traditional arranged by Baldry) – 3:45
 "Black Girl" (Traditional arranged by Lead Belly) – 3:38
 "Good Morning Blues" (Huddie Ledbetter) – 4:19
 "Temptation In My Heart" (Basil Watson, Larry Moore) – 4:30
 "Beat Street" (Watson, Leona Bolme) – 3:55
 "Mystery to Me" (Allan Hull) – 4:00

Personnel 

Long John Baldry - vocals; 6 string & 12 string guitars
Kathi McDonald - vocals
Papa John King - guitar
Butch Coulter - harmonica
Mike Lent - double bass
Jimmy Horowitz - piano and producer
Rolf Henneman - engineer
Dennett Woodland - assistant engineer
Gary Taylor - executive producer
George Ford - bass
Hugh Brockie - classical guitar
Rick Morris - saxophone
Cellina Phillips - backing vocals
Jackie Richardson - backing vocals
Arlene Duncan - backing vocals
Dough Edwards - bass
Mark Lafrance - drums
Ken Boychuck - B3 Hammond organ
John Lee Sanders - saxophone
Nancy Nash - backing vocals

Cover art by: Steve Y. Heurtaux

References 

Long John Baldry albums
1988 live albums
Live blues albums